Aurora Mulligan (born 1984) is an Irish television producer and director. She is known for her work on Top Gear.

Early life 
Mulligan grew up in County Fermanagh, Northern Ireland. She studied politics and political philosophy at the University of Liverpool.

Career
Mulligan was a producer for the BBC and in 2015 became the first female producer on its long running motoring show Top Gear. Later, she joined the cast of the programme and took on the role of a bride whose wedding at St Paul's Cathedral was crashed.

In 2016, she produced a segment in the Isle of Man in which an eight-wheeled all-terrain vehicle rescued some naked ramblers. In 2018, Mulligan moved to Los Angeles and joined Lionsgate's Pilgrim Studios as the executive director of documentaries.

In 2019, Mulligan worked on the 100th Isle of Man TT Races.

Previously, she was a producer at Big Earth Productions, a production company known for producing travel series Long Way Round and Long Way Down. Mulligan also worked as an assistant director on EastEnders, Holby City, and The Bill. She specialises in car and motorbike-related programming.

Personal life
Mulligan was in a relationship with American TV actor Matt LeBlanc for six years. In 2022, Mulligan ended the relationship.

In 2021, an internet meme known as Irish Uncle went viral and it was widely reported that Mulligan's influence was responsible for the look.

Filmography
 Top Gear
 Long Way Round
 Long Way Down
 EastEnders
 Holby City
 The Bill

References

1984 births
Actresses from Northern Ireland
Alumni of the University of Liverpool
Living people